Ooi Kah Yan (born 6 December 2000 in Seremban) is a Malaysian professional squash player. As of February 2018, she was ranked number 109 in the world.

References

2000 births
Living people
Malaysian female squash players
People from Negeri Sembilan
Southeast Asian Games medalists in squash
Southeast Asian Games gold medalists for Malaysia
Competitors at the 2019 Southeast Asian Games
21st-century Malaysian women